Lutf al-Sarary is a Yemeni short story writer and journalist. Born in the countryside, he moved to Taiz as a youth. After graduation, he worked as a manager at Taiz University. His first piece was published in 2006 in the Yemeni newspaper al-Thaqafiah. He gradually made the switch to journalism, eventually becoming cultural editor of Hadeth al-Madenah. His first collection of short stories entitled Like Who Smokes One Cigarette in One Breath came out in 2009 and was well received by Yemeni critics.

References

Yemeni writers
Yemeni journalists
Living people
Year of birth missing (living people)